William John McVitty (25 December 1881 – 6 September 1961) was an Australian rules footballer who played with Essendon in the Victorian Football League (VFL).

Notes

External links 
	

1881 births
1961 deaths
Australian rules footballers from Victoria (Australia)
Essendon Football Club players